Jermaine Anthony Alexander Brown (born 12 January 1983) is an English former professional footballer.

Career
Born in Lambeth, Brown spent his career with Arsenal, before spending short spells with Colchester United and Boston United.
In March 2004, Brown joined King's Lynn on loan from Boston United, but he did not feature for them and ended the deal on compassionate grounds following family illness. He "went AWOL" a few days later. He later played non-league football with Lewes, Margate and Aldershot Town. After a break from the game, he signed for Chelmsford City on 1 August 2011. He was released in January 2012, and signed for Margate again in January 2013.

References

1983 births
Living people
English footballers
Arsenal F.C. players
Colchester United F.C. players
Boston United F.C. players
Lewes F.C. players
Margate F.C. players
Aldershot Town F.C. players
Chelmsford City F.C. players
English Football League players
Association football midfielders